Ansou Sow (born 9 May 2000) is a Senegalese professional footballer who plays as a forward for French  club Stade Briochin.

Career
On 4 July 2018, Sow signed a professional contract with RC Lens. He made his professional debut with Lens in a 4–1 Ligue 1 win over Lorient on 11 April 2001.

On 21 July 2022, Sow joined Stade Briochin.

References

External links
 

2000 births
Living people
Footballers from Dakar
Senegalese footballers
Association football forwards
RC Lens players
FC Chambly Oise players
Stade Briochin players
Ligue 1 players
Championnat National 2 players
Championnat National 3 players
Senegalese expatriate footballers
Senegalese expatriate sportspeople in France
Expatriate footballers in France